Mir Nasir Khan Talpur was the last Amir of the land that included Sindh and parts of present-day Balochistan and was one of the most active administrators after the decline of the Mughal Empire. He made Hyderabad  the capital of his empire and constructed two forts in the city known as the Pakka Qilla (Brick Fort) and the Kacha Qilla (Mud Fort) and he also built the Maula Ali Qadam Gah (The footsteps of Ali), a Shia shrine at the center of the city. He was a strong follower of the Sufi tradition. He donated a lot of his personal wealth to the Tomb of Shah Abdul Latif Bhittai at Bhit Shah. He and his 30,000 forces were defeated by the forces of the British Empire led by Charles Napier at the Battle of Miani.

Mir Nasir Khan Talpur's defeat was an ill omen for the last Mughal Emperor Bahadur Shah Zafar.

1843 deaths
Conflicts in 1843
Governors of Sindh
Baloch people
Mughal Empire
Year of birth missing
History of Pakistan
Talpur dynasty
Nawabs of Pakistan